Hozan Diyar knows as Diyar Dersim (born 1966, Tunceli) is a Kurdish singer. During 2015 Turkey general elections, he supports HDP, pro-Kurdish party in Turkey, He sings with the party cochairman Selahattin Demirtaş as a part of campaigning the election.

Diyar participated in many concerts in several countries and regions such as in Rojava, Iraqi Kurdistan, Sweden, and United States.

Albums 

 Karwan (Kervan) 1992
 Cenga Jînê (Life War) 1997
 Wey Dinyayê (Wow World) 1999
 Gulê Neçe (Don't go my rose), 2002
 Natirsim (I don't fear)
 Oxir be Ugur (bye bye Ugur)
 Dema Azadî (Time of freedom)
 Kela Dimdim (Dimdim Castle)
 Tîna rojê (Heat of the sun)
 Kehniya Stranan (Fountain of songs)
 Mam Zekî (Uncle Zekî)

Filmography

Film
Rêç (Trace)
Doz (Case)

References 

Kurdish male singers
1966 births
Living people
People from Tunceli Province
Kurdish-language singers
Kurdish musicians